Kharruba was a Palestinian Arab village in the Ramle Subdistrict of Mandatory Palestine, near Modi'in. It was located 8 km east of Ramla. It was depopulated on July 12, 1948, during the 1948 Arab–Israeli War.

History
Kharruba appeared in Ottoman tax registers compiled in 1596 under the name of Harnuba, in the Nahiyas of Ramla, of the Gaza Sanjak. It was indicated as empty (hali), though 25% taxes were paid on agricultural products. These  included wheat, barley, summer crops, vineyards, fruit trees, sesame, goats, beehives, in an addition to occasional revenues; a total of 4,000  akçe.

In 1838, it was noted as a Muslim  village, Khurrubeh,  in the Ibn Humar area in the  District of Er-Ramleh.

In 1863, Victor Guérin described Kharruba as a hamlet of a few huts. He noticed the remains of a medieval fort and suggested it might be the Crusader castle Arnaldi. The following decade, the PEF's  "Survey of Western Palestine" found only ruins.

British Mandate era
At the time of the 1931 census, Kharruba had 21 occupied houses and a population of 119 inhabitants, all Muslims. 

In the  1945 statistics, the village had a population of 170 Muslims. The total land area was 3,374  dunams,  of this, a total of 1,620 dunums  were used for cereals, 25 dunums were irrigated or used for orchards,  while 3 dunams were classified as built-up public areas.

1948, aftermath
It was depopulated during the 1948 Arab–Israeli War on July 12, 1948, by the Yiftach Brigade which reported that it had blown up the houses and "cleared the village".

In 1992 the village site was described: "The site is covered with the stone rubble of the destroyed houses, overgrown with vegetation. Many of the plants that grow on the site are the ones that Palestinians traditionally planted near their homes: cactuses, castor oil (ricinus) plants, and cypress, Christ's thorn, and olive trees. The surrounding land is used by the Israelis as grazing ground."

Archaeology
A site called Haruba is mentioned in the Copper Scroll, the only one of the Dead Sea Scrolls engraved on copper rather than written on parchment. Modern scholars do not believe it to be the site mentioned in the scroll.

In 2012, five suspected antiquities robbers were caught at Kharruba, after damaging a mikveh (ritual bath) dating to the Second Temple period and trenches used as hiding places during the Bar Kokhba revolt.

References

Bibliography

  
  
 
 (p. 394)

External links
Welcome To Kharruba
Kharruba, Zochrot
Survey of Western Palestine, Map 17:  IAA, Wikimedia commons

Arab villages depopulated during the 1948 Arab–Israeli War
District of Ramla
Archaeological sites in Israel